Arthur Joseph Mooney (February 11, 1911 – September 9, 1993) was an American singer and bandleader. His biggest hits were "I'm Looking Over a Four Leaf Clover" and "Baby Face" in 1948 and "Nuttin' For Christmas," with Barry Gordon, in 1955. His fourth million selling song "Honey-Babe" (1955) was used in the motion picture, Battle Cry, having reached the Top 10 in the US.

He also made a popular 1948 recording of "Bluebird of Happiness." Mooney's name, as well as his star on the Hollywood Walk of Fame, was prominently featured in the 1990 motion picture The Adventures of Ford Fairlane.

Death
He died at age 82 in North Miami, Florida of lung disease on September 9, 1993. He was survived by his wife, Vera, his sister, Marce Kaminsky,  and 13 nieces and nephews.

Singles

References

External links

There's Music In The Land : Art Mooney

1911 births
1993 deaths
American bandleaders
MGM Records artists
Musicians from Boston
20th-century American singers
People from Lowell, Massachusetts
People from North Miami, Florida
20th-century American male singers